Debil (meaning "Moronic") is the first full-length studio album by German rock band Die Ärzte, released in 1984, following the EPs Zu schön, um wahr zu sein! and Uns geht's prima.... The songs "Paul" and "Zu spät" were released as singles, without being successful initially. However, a live version of "Zu spät" was released as a single from the live album Nach uns die Sintflut in 1989 and became a moderate hit in Germany.

In 1987, the Federal Department for Media Harmful to Young Persons put the songs "Claudia hat 'nen Schäferhund" and "Schlaflied" on the List of Media Harmful to Young People, with the effect that they could not be sold to minors, nor publicly advertised or displayed. This ban was lifted in 2004, which led to the subsequent reissue of the album (see below).

Track listing

Devil

Following a re-evaluation of the record by the BPjM, Debil was reissued on 21 October 2005 as Devil with slightly altered cover art and additional tracks.

Track listing

 Notes
 Tracks 14–16 were previously released on Original Ärztesoundtrack zum Film "Richy Guitar".
 Track 18 also contains a hidden track, dubbed "Sahnie's Collective Wisdom" and credited to Hans Runge. It consists of a single spoken line ("Ey du Blödmann, du hast die falsche Seite aufgelegt", which means "Hey you dimwit, you've put on the wrong side"), which previously appeared at the beginning of either side of Debil 's cassette and vinyl versions.

Personnel
Farin Urlaub – guitar, vocals
Bela Felsenheimer – drums, vocals
Hans Runge – bass guitar, vocals

Certifications

References

1984 debut albums
Die Ärzte albums
German-language albums
Columbia Records albums